Chlamylla is a genus of sea slugs, aeolid nudibranchs, marine gastropod mollusks in the family Paracoryphellidae.

Species
There are two species within the genus Chlamylla:
 Chlamylla borealis Bergh, 1886
 Chlamylla intermedia (Bergh, 1899)

Synonymised species
 Chlamylla atypica (Bergh, 1899) synonym of Chlamylla borealis Bergh, 1886

References 

Paracoryphellidae